An Obsolete Altar is a 2013 short film is inspired by the 1912 play Achalayatan written by Rabindranath Tagore. The film has been officially selected for International competition as the only Indian film at the Eastern Breeze International Film Festival in Canada and Up and Coming Film Festival in Hannover, Germany, has selected the film, out of 2,982 films submitted from 54 countries.

Plot
Rape is a social cancer. Woman is victimized in everywhere. The country is roaring. The intellects are walking with candles. The government pay the allowances to the victim. The opposition are taking the advantages. The process of purgation has been already started. The media get excited with the justice. But, what will happen if the victim is not a female?

Cast
Jagriti (Avinandan) Bhadra	as	 Genital (It) Victim of rape
Anirban Laulaa 	as	Alter ego of Genital (It)
Joydeep Banerjee	 as	Panchak
Mriganka sekhar Ganguly	 as	Mahapanchak
Anand Singh	 as	Rapist
Tannistha Bhattacharya	 as	Journalist
Satyajit Biswas	 as	Intellect
Arunava Barman	 as	Allegorical Artist (Dancer)
Subhasish Acharya	 as	Allegorical Artist (Dancer)
Swagata Das	 as	Victim of rape
Soumik Goswami	 as	Allegorical Artist (Dancer)
Biswajit Gayen	 as	Allegorical Artist (Dancer)
Sudipta Das	 as	Allegorical Artist (Dancer)
Saheli Das	 as	Victim of rape
Hyash Tanmoy		 as	Photojournalist

References

External links

newfilmmakersonline
Selected film in Up and Coming International Film Festival Hannover
kinopoisk
Selected film in Eastern Breeze International Film Festival Canada
Hindusthan Times Reported on An Obsolete Altar

Bengali-language Indian films
Films set in Kolkata
Indian independent films
Films shot in India
2013 films
Indian short films